A number of steamships were named Barnby, including –

, in service 1906–11, when wrecked
, in service 1946–52, scrapped as Mariandrea in 1953
, in service 1940–41, when torpedoed and sunk

Ship names